Ing Kantha Phavi (born 16 July 1960) is a Cambodian physician and politician who has served as the Minister of Women's Affairs since 2004.

References
 

 

1960 births
Living people
Cambodian expatriates in France 
Cambodian physicians 
21st-century Cambodian women politicians
21st-century Cambodian politicians
Cambodian People's Party politicians
Government ministers of Cambodia
Women government ministers of Cambodia 
Members of the National Assembly (Cambodia)
Pierre and Marie Curie University alumni
École nationale d'administration alumni